Main Haar Nahi Manoun Gi is a Pakistani drama serial started airing on Hum TV from 19 June 2018. It is produced by Momina Duraid under their production banner Momina Duraid Productions. The serial starrs Anzela Abbasi in lead who previously debuted in Hum TV's Gila in 2016.

The serial has a strong female lead protagonist and focuses on the concept of equality and Women's empowerment and explores women journey, generally depicted as the weaker in society.

Plot 

A story based on the concept of promoting women, generally portrayed as the weaker gender in society who tends to fight against all odds to achieve success irrespective of any obstacles and hurdles along the way.

Cast 
Anzela Abbasi as Nimra
Ali Josh as Haroon
Arslan Asad Butt as Adil Hamdani
Saniya Shamshad as Arooba
Noaman Sami as Rohan
Khalid Butt as Shakeel
Humera Zahid
Mariyam Chaudhary
Saima Syed
Fozia Mushtaque as Amma

See also 
 List of programs broadcast by Hum TV

References

External links
 

Pakistani television series
2018 Pakistani television series debuts